Zidell Yards is a former industrial waterfront in Portland, Oregon's South Portland neighborhood, owned by Zidell Companies and planned for development.

The Lot at Zidell Yards
The Lot at Zidell Yards is slated to host outdoor events during the COVID-19 pandemic, including drive-in drag performances featuring Darcelle XV and the Waterfront Blues Festival.

References

South Portland, Portland, Oregon